Gacy (also known as The Crawl Space) is a 2003 American crime horror thriller film written and directed by Clive Saunders, and co-written by David Birke. A direct-to-video release, it is based on the crimes of John Wayne Gacy, an American serial killer who raped, tortured, and murdered at least thirty-three men and boys in Chicago, Illinois during the 1970s. It stars Mark Holton as Gacy.

Plot 

In 1953, the teenage John Wayne Gacy argues with his father, who says he will "never be brave enough" and kicks him.

In 1976, the adult Gacy's lunch with his family is interrupted by a neighbor demanding something be done about the stench coming from his crawl space. Gacy responds angrily that he will. Lunch is interrupted again when Steve, an employee of Gacy's, complains he has not been paid for two weeks. Gacy says he will be paid and orders him off his property. Gacy consults a friend who advises lime for the smell.

While driving at night, Gacy abducts a man, brings him back to his garage and tells him about his problems, then releases him. At work Gacy angrily berates his workers for smoking on the job. He asks his latest employee how he's enjoying working for him, and if he likes wrestling. They wrestle in Gacy's back yard where Gacy pins him down and Steve, watching with another man, calls him a faggot. Gacy is furious.

The next day, Steve and two other men attack Gacy as he comes out of a shop. Steve takes the money from Gacy's wallet, gives some to the other men and tells Gacy that he quits. Late that night, Gacy's wife, Kara, is awake in bed when she hears a car pull up. Gacy gets out and brings out Steve, who's handcuffed, and shoves him into the garage. Investigating, Kara finds clothes strewn about in the garage. She runs to the crawl space entrance where Gacy bursts out, saying that he had been laying down lime.

Gacy hosts his 4th of July fancy dress party, during which he offers Tom Kovak a job, and a speech is made honoring Gacy as an asset to the community. He hires an exterminator to take care of the maggots and cockroaches gathering in the crawl space. Questioned by two police officers about Steve's disappearance, he says Steve told him he was going to Costa Rica or Puerto Rico. One day, Gacy hits one of his employees over the head with a hammer. After cleaning him up, he pays him for his silence and lets him go. Kara discovers a pair of handcuffs and some homosexual magazines in the garage. Gacy blames some employees, saying "you know how I feel about homos". A few days later, Kara takes the two girls and leaves Gacy alone with his mother. Tom is having problems at home, so Gacy suggests he rent Gacy's spare room.

Another late evening, Gacy picks up a male prostitute and stuffs a chloroformed rag into his face. The prostitute awakens suspended by chains in Gacy's garage. The next morning, Gacy leaves the prostitute in the park where he stumbles away. Gacy lays concrete in the crawl space to try and cover the stench. He meets with James Burrel and agrees to buy his car. Inviting Burle in for a drink, he instead drowns him in the bathtub. Gacy is running out of room in the crawl space. As Gacy and Tom are watching a video reel of how Gacy started his business, the video cuts to pornography. Tom freaks out and spends the night awake and terrified.

Tom decides to leave, but Gacy tricks him into being handcuffed and starts strangling him. Tom manages to escape and runs to the police. While Gacy is out of the house the police enter and find dozens of watches and drivers licenses.

Gacy is arrested as the police exhume the bodies from the crawl space. The film ends with Gacy's last words before he's put to death. They are, "Kiss my ass!"

Cast

Reception 

On the film review aggregate website Rotten Tomatoes, Gacy received a 17% approval rating, based on six reviews, with an average rating of 3.8/10. Chuck Wilson of LA Weekly found Gacy to be an "unenlightening" and "unconvincing" film that suffered from "dime-store psychology" and a failure to "convey the subtleties of Gacy’s scheming intellect." Mike Long of DVD Talk gave the film a half star out of a possible five, opined that it "offers no suspense, no gore, and no thrills" and concluded, "If nothing else, a film about a serial killer should offer a glimpse inside the criminal mind. If it can't do that, it could at least be an entertaining exploitation film. Gacy is neither of those things and there is absolutely no reason to see this movie." Reel Film Review's David Nusair commended Mark Holton's performance as Gacy, but lambasted the film itself, which he derided as being an ineptly written and directed "bore" that "completely fails to make any kind of impact." Conversely, Gacy was praised for its "dark, disturbing insight into Gacy" by Steve Barton of Dread Central, who went on to write that the "horrifying and informative" film was "well-worth seeking out to learn more about America's most notorious serial killer." Buzz McClain of AllMovie also praised the "ruthlessly fascinating" film, which he gave a score of 3/5.

See also 

 To Catch a Killer, a 1992 film about John Wayne Gacy
 Dear Mr. Gacy, a 2010 film about John Wayne Gacy

References

External links 

 
 
 

2003 crime thriller films
2003 direct-to-video films
2003 films
2003 horror films
2003 independent films
2003 LGBT-related films
2003 psychological thriller films
2000s American films
2000s biographical films
2000s English-language films
2000s horror thriller films
2000s police films
2000s psychological horror films
2000s serial killer films
American biographical films
American crime thriller films
American direct-to-video films
American films based on actual events
American horror thriller films
American independent films
American LGBT-related films
American police detective films
American psychological horror films
American psychological thriller films
American serial killer films
Biographical films about LGBT people
Biographical films about serial killers
Crime films based on actual events
Crime horror films
Crimes against sex workers in fiction
Cultural depictions of American men
Cultural depictions of kidnappers
Cultural depictions of male serial killers
Cultural depictions of rapists
Direct-to-video crime films
Direct-to-video horror films
Direct-to-video thriller films
Fictional portrayals of the Chicago Police Department
Films about adultery in the United States
Films about child abuse
Films about divorce
Films about dysfunctional families
Films about John Wayne Gacy
Films about kidnapping in the United States
Films about male prostitution in the United States
Films about rape in the United States
Films set in 1953
Films set in 1967
Films set in 1968
Films set in 1972
Films set in 1976
Films set in 1977
Films set in 1978
Films set in Chicago
Films set in Iowa
Films set in Wisconsin
Films shot in Los Angeles
Films shot in Los Angeles County, California
Films shot in Pasadena, California
Films with screenplays by David Birke
Homophobia in fiction
Horror films about clowns
Horror films based on actual events
LGBT-related horror thriller films
LGBT-related films based on actual events
Lionsgate films
Male bisexuality in film
Period horror films
Thriller films based on actual events
Torture in films